is the name of an area located in the North of Maniwa City in the norther of Okayama Prefecture, Japan. Hiruzen was formed of 3 small towns: Chuka, Yatsuka & Kawakami, which together were known as the town of Hiruzen, which was merged with several other towns to become current Maniwa City in 2005. Hiruzen is an important part of the Daisen-Oki National Park.

Etymology

Peaks
They run from west to east and include:

History

Mount Hiruzen has been settled from the Japanese stone age. Remains from the Jōmon period (14,000–300 BCE) are scattered across the Hiruzen and Ōbagun Basins. The Yayoi period (300 BCE–250 CE) saw a great population increase to the area south of Hiruzen. The Hiruzen Basin is home to six kofun burial mound groups, each featuring a medium-size round kofun of approximately 10 to 30 meters. The kofun groups of the Hiruzen Basin date to the late 5th century. By the Kamakura period (1185–1333) the Hiruzen Basin had become the northernmost point of the domain of the Tokuyama clan. In the Sengoku period (1467–1573) the Hiruzen region was contested by the Yamana, Akamatsu, Miura and other clans. After the establishment of the Tokugawa shogunate in 1603, the area was ruled peacefully under direct control of the shogunate, the Mori clan, the Matsudaira clan, and others.

Geography

Hiruzen is a dormant, but not extinct, volcano located to the southeast of Mount Daisen. The three peaks of Hiruzen, along with a few smaller peaks, form the Hiruzen volcanic belt, a subset of the Daisen volcanic belt. An eruption of Daisen occurred approximately 350,000 years ago, and created a  lake, known as Lake Hiruzenbara, above the Hiruzen Plateau. Lake Hiruzenbara was gradually eroded on its eastern perimeter by the Asahi River, and dried up and disappeared over time.

Hiruzen Highlands
Known as a Resort area within west Japan, it receives the second highest number of tourists per year (25 million) within the prefecture after Kurashiki City (30 million). The plateau and its surrounding areas have been developed for recreation, specifically skiing and camping. Hiruzen Jersey Land, the largest Jersey cattle ranch in Japan, is also located on the plateau. Hiruzen Horse Park offers horseback riding on the plateau.

Asahi River

The Hiruzen Plateau is the source of the Asahi River, which flows  from Hiruzen south across the Okayama Plain, and empties into Kojima Bay on the Inland Sea in the eastern part of Okayama City. The Shiogama-reisen Cold Spring is designated as the source of the river, and is a protected natural habitat of the Japanese giant salamander. The dam forms an artificial lake, Lake Yubara, directly to the southeast of the Hiruzen Plateau. The Hiruzen Plateau has also developed recreational facilities for camping, skiing, and fishing.

Hiking

After Daisen, Hiruzen is the most visited mountain in the region, bordering on Tottori Prefecture.  Hiruzen is a popular hiking destination. All three peaks are suitable for beginning climbers. The summit of Kamihiruzen and Nakahiruzen can be reached in approximately two hours, and Shimohiruzen in one hour and forty minutes, with a ridge trail leading across all three peaks taking roughly 10–12 hours from ascent to descent.

Notable Places & Events 

 Shiogama Reisen (Cold Spring)
Hiruzen Jersey Land
Hiruzen Winery
A small winery that uses local wild mountain grapes to produce its wines. Has won various awards.
 Hiruzen Herb Garden "Herbill"
 With hundreds of species of flowers and herbs, this garden is most well known for its lavender, which blooms during the month of July, and English-style garden roses, the English theme of which it carries to part of its menu, providing Cream Tea and imported British teas. Covered in snow during the Winter months, Herbill opens between April to December.
 Oomiya Obon Dance
 Designated an Intangible Important Cultural Property, this dance has a long history spanning back hundreds of years. The dance takes place multiple times during August, at various Shrines throughout Hiruzen.

External links
Hiruzen Highland
Hiruzen-kogen Highlands

References

Mountains of Tottori Prefecture
Mountains of Okayama Prefecture